José Andrés Vega Solano (born 22 November 1987) is a Costa Rican road racing cyclist. His younger brother Elías is also a cyclist.

Major results

2006
 National Under-23 Road Championships
3rd Road race
3rd Time trial
2008
 2nd Time trial, National Under-23 Road Championships
2011
 2nd Time trial, National Road Championships
2012
 1st  Overall Vuelta a Nicaragua
1st Stages 1, 2 (TTT), 4 & 5
 2nd Time trial, National Road Championships
2013
 6th Overall Vuelta Ciclista a Costa Rica
1st Stages 2 & 6
2014
 1st Stage 6 Vuelta Ciclista a Costa Rica
2017
 1st Stage 2 Vuelta Ciclista a Costa Rica

References

External links

Living people
1987 births
Place of birth missing (living people)
Costa Rican male cyclists